The Colleton County Railroad was a shortline railroad in Colleton County, South Carolina that existed briefly in the mid-1980s. It was organized in 1986 to take over a Seaboard System branch line. In 1988, it was merged into the Hampton and Branchville Railroad.

See also

Hampton and Branchville Railroad

References

Defunct South Carolina railroads
Railway companies established in 1986
Railway companies disestablished in 1988
1986 establishments in South Carolina
1988 disestablishments in South Carolina